Mohamed Boughanmi (born 27 October 1991) is a French rugby union tighthead prop and he currently plays for Section Paloise and the France national team.

International career
Boughanmi was part of the French squad for the 2017 Six Nations Championship. He made his debut in the first test of the 2017 France rugby union tour of South Africa.

References

External links
France profile at FFR
ESPN Profile

1991 births
Living people
French rugby union players
France international rugby union players
Rugby union props
Sportspeople from Seine-Saint-Denis
AS Béziers Hérault players
RC Toulonnais players
Stade Rochelais players
Section Paloise players
RC Narbonne players